Avigdor HaKohen Miller (August 28, 1908 – April 20, 2001) was an American Haredi rabbi, author, and lecturer most prominently known for instigating and invigorating extreme right-wing politics in American Orthodox Jewry.

He served simultaneously as a communal rabbi, mashgiach ruchani (spiritual supervisor) of Yeshiva Rabbi Chaim Berlin, and as a teacher in Beis Yaakov. After his son opened Yeshiva Beis Yisrael in 1986, Miller served as its rosh yeshiva (dean).

Rabbi Miller was an American-born, European trained rabbi immersed in the most demanding Lithuanian academic and mussar traditions. He not only spoke perfect English, but also had a unique oratory presence that captivated audiences. As the first prominent rabbi to use the medium of tape recorders to spread Torah in an unprecendented fashion to the public at-large, he reached an amazingly broad spectrum of audience.

Early life 
Avigdor Miller was born Victor Miller in Baltimore, Maryland. He was a kohen. Although he attended public school, only Yiddish was spoken at home. After school, he went to learn in an afternoon Talmud Torah. When he finished his regular classes at the Talmud Torah, the school arranged for him to learn privately with Avrohom Eliyahu Axelrod, a Lubavitcher Hasid. The Talmud Torah was unable to pay Axelrod, but he continued to teach Miller anyway. Miller would never forget that Axelrod continued to teach him without being paid, and spoke about him with appreciation.

At age 14, Miller went to New York City to attend Yeshivas Rabbenu Yitzchok Elchonon, at the time the only American high school offering high-level Jewish learning. After this, he enrolled in Yeshiva College. He graduated from both Yeshiva College and Rabbi Isaac Elchanan Theological Seminary (RIETS), attaining a B.A. and rabbinical ordination, respectively.

While a student at Yeshiva College, Miller joined a chavurah (study group) together with a few other young men to study Mussar from the sefer Mesillas Yesharim. The organizer of the chavurah, which met clandestinely in Miller's dormitory room, was Yaakov Yosef Herman, a builder of Orthodox Judaism in New York City of the early 20th century. Some of the men in this group, which included Nosson Meir Wachtfogel, Yehuda Davis, and Mordechai Gifter, would go on to become notable Haredi rabbis in their own right. Herman encouraged Miller to travel to Europe to learn Torah in the yeshivas there. Miller met Isaac Sher, the son-in-law of Nosson Tzvi Finkel, who was in New York collecting funds for the Slabodka yeshiva at the time. Sher did not raise much money, since this was during the Great Depression. But Sher would later declare this to be his most successful trip to America, since he was able to recruit and bring such a bright student to Slabodka.

In 1932, at the age of 24, Miller arrived in Europe to study at the Slabodka yeshiva in Slabodke, Lithuania, where he was greeted personally by Avraham Grodzinski, the mashgiach ruchani (spiritual supervisor). While there, he studied under Sher. As a student in Slabodka, Miller was so diligent in his studies that he wore out his shirtsleeves over the lectern he was using. He was compelled to wear a coat during the summer, in order to conceal the multitude of overlapping patches that were his trousers. Rabbi Shulman of Slabodka, a son-in-law of Sher, introduced Miller to Ettel Lessin, daughter of Yaakov Moshe HaCohen Lessin of Slabodka (later mashgiach in RIETS). They were married in 1935.

Rabbinic career 
In 1938, due to the rise of Nazism and the tensions leading up to World War II, Miller sought to return to the United States with his wife and two sons. The American consul in Kovno at the time was a public high-school classmate and acquaintance of Miller's from Baltimore. He arranged passage for Miller's wife and children, who were not United States citizens.

Upon returning to the U.S., Miller became rabbi of Congregation Agudath Shalom in Chelsea, Massachusetts. Initially, the community was taken aback by Miller's audacious pedagogy, and the sheer volume of his Torah presentations, attempting in vain to restrain his unconventional approach. Within a few years, however, the community had changed their minds, desiring for Miller to stay longer. Miller received special dispensation to refrain from sending his young sons to public school. Instead, he had them tutored privately in secular subjects, and taught them Jewish studies himself. His sons still needed to appear at the public school twice a year for testing. This arrangement seemed to Miller to not be ideal; so, he began to look for a community with a stronger Jewish presence.

In 1944, Yitzchak Hutner, rosh yeshiva (dean) of Yeshiva Rabbi Chaim Berlin, hired Miller to become its mashgiach ruchani, in which position he served until 1964. In 1945, he assumed the pulpit of the Young Israel of Rugby in East Flatbush, Brooklyn. In 1975, with neighborhood demographics changing, Miller established the Bais Yisroel of Rugby Torah Center on Ocean Parkway in Midwood, Brooklyn. In 1986, when his son opened Yeshiva Beis Yisrael, Miller served as its rosh yeshiva.

Death and burial 
Miller was taken to Maimonides Medical Center shortly after Passover, 2001.

At a memorial service the following Sunday, Miller was eulogized by Yosef Rosenblum, the rosh yeshiva of Beth Hamedrash Shaarei Yosher; Shmuel Berenbaum, rosh yeshiva of Mir yeshiva; Chaim Pinchas Scheinberg, rosh yeshiva of Torah Ore, who was in America on a visit from Jerusalem; and Miller's son-in-law, Shmuel Brog. Miller's body was transported to Israel, where a funeral was held at the Mir Yeshiva in Jerusalem.

After his death, a synagogue, Nitei Avigdor, was founded in Miller's name in Williamsburg, Brooklyn.

Legacy and views 
Miller authored several books about Jewish history, Jewish thought and other subjects. Over a span of 50 years, more than 2,500 lectures by Miller in English were published as tape cassettes, as well as several in Yiddish. He gave most of his lectures in his Midwood synagogue. While also covering Torah-oriented concepts that might have been heard in more typical Orthodox lectures, Miller regularly delivered his own unique take on political and societal themes.

Miller believed it is not appropriate to make fun of people due to their race. He stated  "to make leitzanus of [make fun of] people because they’re black or brown doesn’t make sense at all. Being black or brown is no sin. You can’t make leitzanus [fun] about that."

Miller believed that all Americans, including African Americans, have a right to equality. He stressed that it needs to be done peacefully and through legal means.

He criticized the Emancipation Proclamation, saying that it would have been better for African-Americans to have endured another 50 to 100 years of slavery in order to "civilize" them.

Miller was a supporter of police brutality against criminals. Before the 1976 elections he said, "We need more police brutality. And although innocent people might suffer sometimes, it pays." After the Kent State shootings, where 3 Jewish and 1 non-Jewish student were shot by the Ohio National Guard at an anti-Vietnam War protest, Miller stated he sent a letter of congratulations to the government, saying

Miller was outspoken in his belief that the Holocaust was a divine response to Jewish cultural assimilation in Europe. He wrote:
 
Miller was a staunch opponent of Zionism, in both its religious and secular forms, and was known to help the Satmar Hasidim translate their anti-Zionist ads in The New York Times.

Miller was known to lambaste other Orthodox Jewish organizations, such as the Orthodox Union, for allowing the teaching of the scientific theory of evolution. He referred to the killer of Harvey Milk, the first openly gay man to be elected to public office in California, as a "decent gentile".

Bibliography
Miller's books include:

References

Further reading

 Yakir Englander,  Changing Concepts of the Ultra-Orthodox Body: Rabbi Avigdor Miller as a Test Case Academia

External links

1908 births
2001 deaths
Rabbis from Maryland
Religious leaders from Baltimore
Writers from Baltimore
Writers from Brooklyn
Jewish American historians
Orthodox rabbis from New York City
Jewish anti-Zionism in the United States
Kohanim writers of Rabbinic literature
Rabbi Isaac Elchanan Theological Seminary semikhah recipients
American Haredi rabbis
Anti-Zionist Haredi rabbis
Mashgiach ruchani
Orthodox Jewish outreach
Jewish creationists
Burials at the Jewish cemetery on the Mount of Olives
Yiddish-language writers
Historians from New York (state)
Slabodka yeshiva alumni
20th-century American rabbis
21st-century American rabbis
Historians from Maryland